Shock Jock was an Australian television comedy series on TV1. The series lasted for two series between 2001 and 2002 and was created by comedian Tim Ferguson.

Ferguson starred along with Matthew Dyktynski, Michael Veitch, Tom Budge, Rod Mullinar, Sancia Robinson, Fiona Todd and Cassandra Magrath, with many well-known Australian actors and comedians in guest roles. Tiriel Mora joined the second season.

It focused on an Australian talkback radio station, CHAT-AM, in the 1980s. The introduction of FM radio in the early 1980s was leading to the slow demise of the AM band. CHAT-AM discovered shock jock Barry Gold (Matthew Dyktynski) and its fortunes were reversed as the station transformed into a popular tabloid show.

Shock Jock was the first original series produced for TV1.

The series was produced by Mockingbird and Mondayitis Productions and was distributed by Foster Gracie TV.

See also
 List of Australian television series

References

External links
 Official website

TV1 (Australian TV channel) original programming
Australian comedy television series
2001 Australian television series debuts
2002 Australian television series endings